In molecular biology, TauD refers to a protein domain that in many enteric bacteria is used to break down taurine (2-aminoethanesulfonic acid) as a source of sulfur under stress conditions. In essence, they are domains found in enzymes that provide bacteria with an important nutrient.

Function
This protein family consists of TauD/TfdA taurine catabolism dioxygenases. The Escherichia coli tauD gene is required for the utilization of taurine (2-aminoethanesulfonic acid) as a sulfur source and is expressed only under conditions of sulfate starvation. TauD is an alpha-ketoglutarate-dependent dioxygenase catalyzing the oxygenolytic release of sulfite from taurine. The 2,4-dichlorophenoxyacetic acid/alpha-ketoglutarate dioxygenase from Burkholderia sp. (strain RASC) also belongs to this family. TfdA from Ralstonia eutropha (Alcaligenes eutrophus) is a 2,4-D monooxygenase.

Structure
This structure has a number of alpha helices and beta sheets.

References

Protein families
Protein domains
Oxidoreductases